Dazzle is a video recorder that allows people to record video from analog composite video sources (DVD Player, VCR, etc.) over USB. It also records analog stereo audio.

Setup

There are two different ways one can connect components to the Dazzle. One way is to connect a VCR or video game console directly into the unit with RCA or S video. Another way is to use three composite splitters to split the AV signal, sending one into the Dazzle, and another to a TV. This method is popular for recording from video game consoles, since it provides a real time feed into a TV (used as a preview monitor) while simultaneously capturing the footage.

History 

The original version was the DVC 80 model which was released on April 16, 2002.  The maximum resolution of the Dazzle DVC 80 is 320x288 as higher resolutions don't make any difference.  Later models had the ability to do higher resolutions.  The Dazzle DVC 80 only came in black, while later models had multiple color options.

References
https://www.youtube.com/results?search_query=dazzle+setup&aq=f

Digital audio recording
Video editing software
Corel software